Uloborus glomosus is a species of spider in the family Uloboridae. It is one of only a few Uloborus species found in North America and the only species found in Canada. Like all other species in the Uloboridae, Uloborus glomosus does not possess venom glands, relying instead on cribellate, a fuzzy non sticky silk that they use to trap and then wrap their prey. This species exhibits different disturbance behaviors depending on whether there are eggsacs present. If present the female spider will jerk at the web and if not present, then the female spider will walk to the opposite side of the web.

References

Uloboridae
Spiders described in 1841
Spiders of North America